Dobelle is a surname. Notable people with the surname include:

Edith H. J. Dobelle (born 1944), American government official
Evan Dobelle (born 1945), American public official and higher education administrator
Martin Dobelle (1906–1986), American surgeon
William H. Dobelle (1941–2004), biomedical researcher